Little Flat Brook is a  tributary of Flat Brook in Sussex County, New Jersey in the United States.

Upstream of the confluence with Little Flat Brook, Flat Brook is known as Big Flat Brook.

See also
List of rivers of New Jersey

References

External links
 High Point State Park
 Stokes State Forest

Tributaries of the Delaware River
Rivers of New Jersey
Rivers of Sussex County, New Jersey